Rolesville is a town in northeastern Wake County, North Carolina, United States, a suburb of the capital city of Raleigh. It is the second oldest town in Wake County and has been one of the fastest-growing towns in the state of North Carolina for the past several years. The population was 9,475 at the 2020 census.

Rolesville was incorporated on January 18, 1837, by the North Carolina Legislature. In 2012, the town celebrated its 175th anniversary.

Geography

Elected Officials 
The Town of Rolesville has an elected body composed of a mayor and five commissioners.  The responsibility of the Town Board is to review, hear, consider, and approve/disapprove items of business affecting the town residents.  The mission of the Board of Commissioners is to uphold the values and traditions that make Rolesville, the second oldest incorporated Town in Wake County, a very special place to live.  It is the board's desire to make sure that Rolesville continues to be progressive in its attitude and outlook towards change, all the while maintaining its small town charm and friendly neighborhood communities.

Mayor: Ronnie Currin

Mayor Pro Tem: Paul Vilga

Commissioner: Sheilah Sutton

Commissioner: Michelle Medley

Commissioner: Dan Alston

Commissioner: April Sneed

Demographics

2020 census

As of the 2020 United States census, there were 9,475 people, 2,204 households, and 2,054 families residing in the town.

2015
As of the census of 2015, there were 6,074 people, and 2,113 households, in the town. The population density was 962.4 people per square mile (214.8/km2). The racial makeup of the town was 74.1% White, 17.8% African American, 3% Asian, 0.4% Native American, 2.1% from 2 or more races and 4.0% from other races.  Hispanic or Latino of any race were 6.2% of the population.

Of the 2,113 households, 35.4% had children under the age of 18 living with them, 62.3% were married couples living together, 7.1% had a female householder with no husband present, and 24.9% were non-families. 20.1% of all households were made up of individuals, and 8.5% had someone living alone who was 65 years of age or older. The average household size was 2.57 and the average family size was 2.94.

In the town, the population was spread out, with 19.7% under the age of 18, 4.6% from 18 to 24, 70.6% over 18, and 8.0% who were 65 years of age or older. The median age was 36 years. For every 100 females, there were 110 males.  80% of Town residents have graduated high school and 50% have a bachelor's degree or higher.

The median income for a household in the town was $46,838, and the median income for a family was $73,156. Males had a median income of $52,731 versus $41,433 for females.  The median house price is $248,000. The per capita income for the town was $31,409. About 7.9% of the population was below the poverty line.

Geology
Rolesville is the namesake of the Rolesville diorite Batholith, also known as the Rolesville Pluton.  While the batholith extends into regions north and south of Wake County, the bedrock formation is particularly visible in the form of rocky outcrops within the town limits and the immediate vicinity.

Parks & Recreation 
The Town of Rolesville Parks and Recreation Advisory Board, staff, and developers continually work together to improve the park system for area residents. Rolesville currently has three parks, acres of open space, and miles of trails being planned and designed through approved development. The Department offers several youth and adult athletics leagues, recreation programming, summer camps, and special events throughout the year.
 Parks and Facilities
 Main Street Park (200 S Main Street)
 Redford Place Park (121 Redford Place Drive)
 Mill Bridge Nature Park (425 Nature Park Drive)
 Rolesville Community Center (514 Southtown Circle).
 Athletics (youth and adult)
 Recreation Programming
 Special Events

Education 
 Rolesville Elementary School
 Rolesville Middle School
 Rolesville High School
 Sanford Creek Elementary School
 Thales Academy Junior High/High School - Rolesville

Accolades 
 Realtor.com: One of America's top 10 boom towns (#7) 
 SafeWise: Top 50 safest cities in North Carolina, 2015 (#23)

References

External links
 Town of Rolesville official website
 Rolesville Parks and Recreation Department
 Rolesville Parks and Recreation Advisory Board
 Rolesville Chamber of Commerce

1837 establishments in North Carolina
Populated places established in 1837
Towns in Wake County, North Carolina
Towns in North Carolina